Burbank Airport station is a proposed California High-Speed Rail station in Burbank, California, to be located at the Hollywood Burbank Airport adjacent to and just west of that facility's proposed replacement passenger terminal, which will be built in the northeast quadrant of the airfield. The site for the rail station is bounded by Cohasset Street to the north, Winona Avenue on the south, and Hollywood Way along the eastern end of the airport property. 

The station connects the Palmdale to Burbank and Burbank to Los Angeles project sections of the California high-speed rail line, but is considered to be part of the latter. The station will be mostly underground, but an above-grade building will tie it into the relocated airport terminal complex. 

Plans call for the approach tunnels and station box to be mostly built using the cut and cover method — except for those portions under active taxiway D and active runway 8-26, which will be constructed using the Sequential Extraction Method (SEM) to avoid ground subsidence.

The proposed HSR station is separate from, and not connected to, the nearby Metrolink commuter rail station on their Antelope Valley Line, known as Burbank Airport–North station. No plans currently exist to directly connect that station to the proposed high-speed rail (HSR) station, but the airport authority runs an "on demand" shuttle between the present terminal and this Metrolink station, which is just northeast of the airport. 

Similarly, there is a joint Metrolink/Amtrak station just to the south of the airport — known on the Metrolink Ventura County Line as Burbank Airport–South and as Hollywood Burbank Airport to Amtrak riders on their Pacific Surfliner. That station is within walking distance to the present airport terminal, but will be considerably farther away once the new terminal opens. It is not known if the airport plans to restart a similar shuttle service to this rail station once the air terminal is moved, but that may be likely since much of the airport's rental car infrastructure is housed across the street in the Regional Intermodal Transportation Center at the corner of Hollywood Way and Empire Avenue. However, like to the north there are no present plans to physically directly link the HSR station to this existing rail station to the south.

References

External links
 Burbank Airport Station - California High-Speed Rail
 City of Burbank - High-Speed Rail
 Hollywood Burbank Airport terminal relocation project website

Railway stations in Los Angeles County, California
Buildings and structures in Burbank, California
Railway stations scheduled to open in 2030
Proposed California High-Speed Rail stations